Judy Cassab  (15 August 19203 November 2015), born Judit Kaszab, was an Australian painter.

Early years
Judy Cassab was born in Vienna, on 15 August 1920 to Jewish Hungarian parents. She began painting at twelve years old and began studying at the Academy of Art in Prague in 1938 but was forced to flee the German occupation in 1939. Cassab worked in a factory under an assumed name and put her artistic skills to use after hours forging papers and passports.

Her husband, Jancsi Kampfner, was put in a forced labour camp by the Nazis in World War II, and returned to Hungary in 1944.

Cassab, her husband and two sons emigrated to Australia in 1951 and settled in Sydney. Cassab became an Australian citizen in 1957.

Career 
Cassab was the first woman to win the Archibald Prize twice:
 1960 for a portrait of Stan Rapotec
 1967 for a portrait of Margo Lewers.

She held more than fifty solo exhibitions in Australia, as well as others in Paris and London.

After Cassab's work was acquired by the National Gallery, she was interviewed by James Gleeson about how she captured people's character in their portraits. This interview later formed part of the James Gleeson Oral History Collection.

Solo exhibitions 
 1953 - Macquarie Galleries, Sydney
 1953 - Macquarie Galleries, Sydney
 1959 - Newcastle City Art Gallery
 1959 - Crane Kalman Gallery, London
 1963 - Macquarie Galleries, Sydney
 1961 - Crane Kalman Gallery, London
 1962 - Argus Gallery, Melbourne
 1963 - Rudy Koman Gallery, Sydney
 1964 - Georges Gallery, Melbourne
 1964 - Von Bertouch Gallery, Newcastle
 1917 - Skinner Gallery, Perth
 1969 - Skinner Gallery, Perth
 1971 - Rudy Koman Gallery, Sydney
 1973 - Skinner Gallery, Perth
 1973 - Reid Gallery, Brisbane
 1975 - Von Bertouch Gallery, Newcastle
 1976 - South Yarra Gallery, Melbourne
 1978 - New Art Centre, London
 1979 - Rudy Koman Gallery, Sydney
 1990 - Masterpieces Fine Art, Hobart
 1980 - Verlie Just Town Gallery, Brisbane
 1981 - Australian Embassy, Paris
 1981 - New Art Centre, London
 1982 - Rudy Koman Gallery, Sydney
 1982 - Greenhill Gallery, Perth
 1982 - Greenhill Gallery, Adelaide
 1983 - Von Bertouch Gallery, Newcastle
 1984 - Verlie Just Town Gallery, Brisbane
 1985 - Holdsworth Gallery, Sydney
 1985 - Benalla Regional Gallery, Victoria
 1985 - Hamilton Regional Gallery, Victoria
 1985 - Caulfield Art Centre, Melbourne
 1985 - David Ellis Gallery, Ballarat, Victoria
 1987 - Holdsworth Gallery, Sydney
 1987 - David Ellis Gallery, Ballarat, Victoria
 1988 - S. H. Ervin Gallery, Sydney and Australian Regional Galleries
 1988 - Brisbane City Hall
 1988 - National Library, Canberra
 1988 - Von Bertouch Gallery, Newcastle
 1988 - Solander Gallery, Canberra
 1989 - David Ellis Gallery, Melbourne
 1989 - Verlie Just Town Gallery, Brisbane
 1990 - Festival of Perth, Fremantle Arts Centre
 1990 - Holdsworth Gallery, Sydney
 1991 - David Ellis Gallery, Melbourne
 1991 - Verlie Just Town Gallery, Brisbane
 1992 - Freeman Gallery, Hobart
 1992 - Schubert Gallery, Gold Coast
 1992 - Solander Gallery, Canberra
 1992 - Von Bertouch Gallery, Newcastle
 1993 - Holdsworth Gallery, Sydney
 1993 - Lyall Burton Gallery, Melbourne
 1994 - Town Gallery, Brisbane
 1994 - Solander Gallery, Canberra
 1994 - Schubert Gallery, Gold Coast
 1995 - Riverina Galleries, Wagga Wagga
 1996 - Von Bertouch Gallery, Newcastle
 1996 - Lyall Burton Gallery, Melbourne
 1996 - BMG Gallery, Adelaide
 1998 - S. H. Ervin Gallery, Sydney
 1998 - Australian Galleries, Sydney
 1999 - Stafford Studios, Perth
 1999 - Von Bertouch Gallery, Newcastle
 1999 - University of Sydney
 2000 - Greythorn Gallery, Melbourne
 2001 - Von Bertouch Gallery, Newcastle
 2001 - Solander Gallery, Canberra
 2001 - Australian Galleries, Sydney
 2003 - Vasarely Muzeum, Budapest
 2003 - Australian Embassy, Dublin
 2003 - Australian Embassy, Berlin
 2004 - Charlemagne Building, Brussels
 2004 - Maitland Regional Art Gallery
 2004 - Michael Carr Gallery, Sydney
 2005 - Solander Gallery, Canberra
 2005 - University of Sydney
 2013 - National Portrait Gallery, Canberra

Awards and distinctions
On 14 June 1969 Cassab was appointed a Commander of the Order of the British Empire (CBE) in "recognition of service to the visual arts".

On 26 January 1988 Cassab was appointed an Officer of the Order of Australia (AO) again in "recognition of service to the visual arts".

On 3 March 1995 Cassab was awarded a Doctor of Letters (honoris causa) from the University of Sydney.

In 2011 Cassab was awarded Hungary’s Gold Cross of Merit.

1955 - The Perth Prize
1955 - The Australian Women's Weekly Prize
1956 - The Australian Women's Weekly Prize
1961 - The Archibald Prize (portrait of Stanislaus Rapotec)
1964 - Sir Charles Lloyd Jones Memorial Prize
1964 - The Helena Rubenstein Prize, Perth
1965 - The Helena Rubenstein Prize, Perth
1965 - Sir Charles Lloyd Jones Memorial Prize
1968 - The Archibald Prize (portrait of Margo Lewers)
1971 - Sir Charles Lloyd Jones Memorial Prize
1973 - Sir Charles Lloyd Jones Memorial Prize
1994 - The Trustee Watercolour Prize, Art Gallery of New South Wales
1994 - The Pring Prize, Art Gallery of NSW
1996 - The Nita Kibble Award for Literature, for Diaries
1996 - Foundation for Australian Literary Studies Award, James Cook University, Townsville
1997 - The Pring Prize, Art Gallery of NSW
1998 - The Pring Prize, Art Gallery of NSW
2003 - The Pring Prize, Art Gallery of NSW
2003 - The Trustee Watercolour Prize, Art Gallery of New South Wales
2004 - The Painters and Sculptors Association of Australia Medal

Personal life
Cassab died on 3 November 2015 at the age of 95 in her nursing home in the Sydney suburb of Randwick.

References

External links 
Profile on The Australian Women's Register
Official website

1920 births
2015 deaths
Australian women painters
Australian Jews
Australian people of Austrian-Jewish descent
Australian people of Hungarian-Jewish descent
Austrian emigrants to Australia
Austrian people of Hungarian-Jewish descent
Artists from Sydney
Artists from Vienna
Hungarian Jews
Australian Commanders of the Order of the British Empire
Officers of the Order of Australia
20th-century Australian women artists
20th-century Australian painters
21st-century Australian women artists
21st-century Australian painters
Archibald Prize winners